Fundación Albacete is the women's football section of Albacete Balompié. Founded in 2004
they reached the Spanish league's top division in 2014.

History
Fundación Albacete was founded in 1997 with the aim to promote sport, education and culture by donations of private sponsors and the support of Albacete Balompié as its founder. It also works as part of the structure of the club's football academy.

The women's team of the Foundation promoted to Primera División for the first time in 2014, after six consecutive attempts in the promotion playoffs. Fundación Albacete remained five seasons in the top tier until it was relegated to the Primera División B in 2019.

Season to season

Honours
 Segunda División (4)
 2009–10, 2011–12, 2012–13, 2013–14

Current squad
As of 3 July 2020.

External links
 Fundación Albacete's website
 Albacete Balompié's website
 

Women's football clubs in Spain
Albacete Balompié
Primera División (women) clubs
Sport in Albacete
Football clubs in Castilla–La Mancha
Segunda Federación (women) clubs
Primera Federación (women) clubs